Hyannis Port (or Hyannisport) is a small residential village located in Barnstable, Massachusetts, United States. It is a summer community on Hyannis Harbor, 1.4 miles (2.3 km) to the south-southwest of Hyannis.

Community
It has a small post office (ZIP code 02647) next door to a small seasonal convenience store, The News Shop and Gallery. It has one of the premier golf courses on Cape Cod, the Hyannisport Club, and is also home to the West Beach Club and the Hyannis Port Yacht Club. St. Andrew's-by-the-Sea Episcopal Church and the Union Chapel conduct Sunday services in the summer. There also is a catwalk that goes to Halls Island with views of Nantucket Sound and a golf course.

Kennedy residences
Hyannis Port is the location of the Kennedy compound and other Kennedy family residences and, as such, is included in the National Register of Historic Places. There are three Kennedy houses on the compound: Rose's, Jack's, and Ethel's. (Ted's house was nearby but not in the compound itself.) Rose Fitzgerald Kennedy was living in Hyannis Port and was the oldest resident in the town of Barnstable when she died at age 104.

Demographics
According to the 2000 U.S. Census on April 1, it had 193 housing units with a resident population of 115 persons living in 46 housing units. There were 147 vacant housing units (76%), 144 of which were for seasonal, recreational, or occasional use. Based on the average family size of 2.97 persons, the summer population is at least 573.

References

External links

Populated coastal places in Massachusetts
Villages in Barnstable, Massachusetts
Villages in Massachusetts